Filip Stevanović (born 25 September 2002) is a Serbian professional footballer who plays as a left winger for Portuguese Primeira Liga side C.D. Santa Clara on loan from Premier League club Manchester City.

Club career
Born in Arilje, he made his first footballing steps at local club Vranić. He later joined the youth system of Partizan after being scouted by Dušan Trbojević.

On 9 December 2018, Stevanović made his official senior debut for Partizan in a 3–0 away league victory over Rad, coming on as an 82nd-minute substitute for Đorđe Ivanović. He made three more league appearances through the remainder of the season.

On 1 August 2019, Stevanović scored his first goal for Partizan after coming off the bench in the return leg of the 2019–20 UEFA Europa League second qualifying round, a 3–0 home win versus Welsh side Connah's Quay Nomads. He thus became their youngest ever scorer in UEFA competitions and the second youngest in club history, at 16 years and 311 days old. Three days later, Stevanović netted his first league goal for Partizan, opening the scoring in an eventual 4–0 home victory over Mačva Šabac. He subsequently contributed with a brace in a 3–0 home win versus Rad on 18 August.

In October 2020, it was announced that Stevanović had agreed to join Manchester City in the following January.

International career
Stevanović made his debut for the Serbia national under-19 football team in the 2020 UEFA European Under-19 Championship qualification.

Career statistics

Notes

References

External links
 
 

2002 births
Sportspeople from Užice
People from Zlatibor District
Living people
Association football forwards
Serbian footballers
Serbia youth international footballers
Serbia under-21 international footballers
FK Partizan players
SC Heerenveen players
C.D. Santa Clara players
Serbian SuperLiga players
Eredivisie players
Primeira Liga players
Serbian expatriate footballers
Expatriate footballers in England
Serbian expatriate sportspeople in England
Expatriate footballers in the Netherlands
Serbian expatriate sportspeople in the Netherlands
Expatriate footballers in Portugal
Serbian expatriate sportspeople in Portugal